The following are the winners of the 23rd annual (1996) Origins Award, presented at Origins 1997:

External links
 1996 Origins Awards Winners

1996 awards
1996 awards in the United States
Origins Award winners